Esta Noche may refer to:

 Esta noche, TVE programme with Carmen Maura  1981-1982
 Esta Noche (gay bar), in San Francisco, California, 1979-1997
 "Esta noche", a song by Azealia Banks
 "Esta noche", a song by Lalo Ebratt and Bad Gyal
 "Esta noche", a song by Alejandra Guzmán from A + No Poder